Johannes Harnish Farmstead is a historic home and farm located at West Lampeter Township, Lancaster County, Pennsylvania. The property includes a Pennsylvania German style farmhouse, a brick Pennsylvania style ancillary dwelling (c. 1860), a frame kitchen (mid-19th century), a stone springhouse (late 18th century), and a frame tobacco shed (c 1925).  Also on the property are the ruins of a stone bank barn from the 19th century and the remains of the family burial ground dated to the 18th century.  The farmhouse was built in 1774, and is a 2 1/2-story, rectangular stone dwelling.  It is four bays by two bays and has a slate covered gable roof with shed dormer.  A one-story rear addition was built between 1958 and 1960.

It was listed on the National Register of Historic Places in 1999.

References

Farms on the National Register of Historic Places in Pennsylvania
Houses completed in 1774
Houses in Lancaster County, Pennsylvania
National Register of Historic Places in Lancaster County, Pennsylvania